The Louisville Kentucky Temple is the 76th operating temple of the Church of Jesus Christ of Latter-day Saints (LDS Church). It is physically located in Pewee Valley, Kentucky with a mailing address of Crestwood, Kentucky. The adjacent communities are suburbs of Louisville.

History
The Louisville Kentucky Temple was announced on March 27, 1999. Thomas S. Monson, of the church's First Presidency, dedicated the Louisville Kentucky Temple on March 19, 2000. The dedication was held after a weeklong public open house.

The Louisville Kentucky Temple has the same design as other small temples built during the same time. The exterior is made of white marble quarried in Vermont and has a single-spire topped with a gold statue of the angel Moroni.

In 2020, the Louisville Kentucky Temple was closed in response to the coronavirus pandemic.

See also

 Comparison of temples of The Church of Jesus Christ of Latter-day Saints
 List of temples of The Church of Jesus Christ of Latter-day Saints
 List of temples of The Church of Jesus Christ of Latter-day Saints by geographic region
 Temple architecture (Latter-day Saints)
 The Church of Jesus Christ of Latter-day Saints in Kentucky
 Religion in Louisville, Kentucky

Additional reading

References

External links
Louisville Kentucky Temple Official site
Louisville Kentucky Temple at ChurchofJesusChristTemples.org

20th-century Latter Day Saint temples

The Church of Jesus Christ of Latter-day Saints in Kentucky
Religious buildings and structures in Kentucky
Temples (LDS Church) completed in 2000
Temples (LDS Church) in the United States
2000 establishments in Kentucky
Churches in Pewee Valley, Kentucky